Voss is a municipality and a traditional district in Vestland county, Norway. The administrative center of the municipality is the village of Vossevangen. Other villages include Bolstadøyri, Borstrondi, Evanger, Kvitheim, Mjølfjell, Oppheim, Stalheim, and Vinje.

The  municipality is the 35th largest by area of Norway's 356 municipalities. Voss is Norway's 77th most populous municipality, with a population of 15,875.

Municipal history

The parish of Voss was established as a municipality on 1 January 1838 (see formannskapsdistrikt law). On 1 January 1867, a small area in northern Voss (population 28) was transferred to the municipality of Hosanger. On 1 January 1868, the municipality's northern district (population 2,009) was separated to form the new municipality of Vossestrand. This left 7,592 residents in Voss. On 21 August 1868, an unpopulated area of northern Voss was transferred to Vossestrand. On 1 January 1885, the western district of Voss (population 2,045) was separated to form the new municipality of Evanger. This left Voss with 5,403 residents.

During the 1960s, there were many municipal mergers across Norway due to the work of the Schei Committee. On 1 January 1964, the municipality of Voss (population 10,575), the municipality of Vossestrand (population 1,573), and most of the municipality of Evanger (population 1,075) were all merged into a new, larger municipality of Voss. (The rest of Evanger was merged into the new municipality of Vaksdal.)

On 1 January 2020, the neighboring municipality of Granvin merged with Voss, creating a larger Voss municipality. Before the merger, it was known as Voss kommune, but afterward it was called Voss herad, using the title herad which Granvin formerly had used.

Name
The Old Norse form of the name was Vǫrs, and this might have been the old name of lake Vangsvatnet. If so, the name probably is derived from the word vǫrr, meaning "wave" or "sea" (-s is a common suffix in old Norwegian place names).

Coat of arms
Voss's coat of arms was adopted in 2019 for use starting in 2020 after Granvin and Voss merged. The arms were similar to the old arms of Granvin Municipality and used the colors of the old arms of Voss. The arms are red with a white hardanger fiddle (Hardingfele), a Norwegian folk instrument. The area has an active folk-music tradition.

The old arms were granted on 8 July 1977. They show a deer on a red background. The arms are based on the seal of Peter, who was the owner of the farm Finne in Voss, one of the largest farms in Western Norway during the Middle Ages. He used a silver deer on a red background as his personal coat of arms in 1303. His son also used a deer on his seals, as did most of their relatives until 1460. The shape and position of the deer varied, but it always was the main figure.

Churches
The Church of Norway has seven parishes in Voss. It is part of the Hardanger og Voss prosti (deanery) in the Diocese of Bjørgvin.

History
{{Historical populations
|footnote = Source: Statistics Norway.
|shading = off
|1951|9433
|1960|10275
|1970|13765
|1980|14163
|1990|14035
|2000|13726
|2010|13902
|2020|15543
}}

After the German invasion of Norway on 9 April 1940, Voss was the main point of mobilisation for the Norwegian Army in the west, since the city of Bergen had already fallen on 9 April. From Bergen and the Hardangerfjord, the Nazis met stiff Norwegian resistance. In Hardanger, some of the Germans climbed up the mountains from Aalvik; the rest went through Granvin. To break down this resistance, the Luftwaffe bombed Voss on 23 and 24 April, and the surrounding countryside on 25 April. Nine people died in the bombing, which completely destroyed the old wood-built town centre. On 26 April, German forces entered Voss, which remained occupied until 8 May 1945.

In 1964, Voss was enlarged with the incorporation of the neighbouring municipalities Vossestrand and Evanger, which had until then been separate municipalities within the traditional district also known as Voss.

Government
All municipalities in Norway, including Voss, are responsible for primary education (through 10th grade), outpatient health services, senior citizen services, unemployment and other social services, zoning, economic development, and municipal roads. Voss is governed by a municipal council of elected representatives, which in turn elects a mayor. Voss falls under the Hordaland District Court and the Gulating Court of Appeal.

Municipal council
Voss's municipal council  is made up of 43 representatives who are elected to four-year terms. The party breakdown of the council is as follows:

Mayor
The mayors of Voss (incomplete list):
2011–present: Hans-Erik Ringkjøb (Ap)
2007-2011: Gunn Berit Lunde Aarvik (Ap)
1999-2007: Bjørn Christensen (Ap)
1992-1999: Ragnhild Skjerveggen (Sp)
1984-1991: Peder Vangsnes (Ap)
1976-1983: Anders S. Ringheim (Sp)
1972-1975: Nils Mugaas (Ap)
1964-1971: Lars Nesheim Hovda (Sp)
1960-1963: Arne Nilsen (Ap)

Geography and climate
Voss is in the innermost part of Bolstadsfjorden and includes the valleys that head inland from there. Voss has several large lakes: Evangervatnet, Hamlagrøvatnet, Lønavatnet, Oppheimsvatnet, Torfinnsvatnet, and Vangsvatnet. In the north, Voss reaches to the Nærøydalen valley, which leads to the Nærøyfjorden. The Stalheimsfossen waterfall near Stalheim sits just above that valley. The Raundalen valley in the east is the main route of the Bergensbanen railway line, which connects eastern and western Norway.

Voss has a humid continental climate (Dfb in the Köppen climate classification if  is used as winter threshold. If the original  is used, then Voss will be classified as an oceanic climate (Cfb). The wettest time of year is October - January, and the driest season is April - July. The all-time high temperature is  recorded 24 July 2014; the all-time low is  recorded 8 January 2010.

Tourism

Voss is surrounded by snow-capped mountains, forests, lakes and fast-flowing whitewater rivers. This has led to its development as a notable center of skiing, water sports, skydiving, paragliding and other adventure sports. Every year in the last week of June the area hosts the Ekstremsportveko (Extreme Sports Week), which is regarded as the world's premier extreme sports festival. Bømoen, the local airstrip, is home to Skydive Voss, one of the largest dropzones in Norway, as well as a gliding club. The rivers provide various levels of white water, attracting kayaking, rafting and river boarding. Kite surfing and para-bungee may be seen on lake Vangsvatnet. The ski area, to the north of the town, is accessible via a cable car, Hangursbanen. There is also chair lift access from Bavallen, a short distance northeast of Voss.

The town's proximity to the Sognefjord and its position between Bergen and Flåm on the scenic railway have made it popular with tourists. One of the sights on the road to Flåm is the waterfall Tvindefossen.

The Voss Museum displays several old farmsteads, including a larger-than-life stone statue of Lars O. Kindem. Next to the open-air part, there is a museum with over 20,000 items from traditional farm life.

Bird life
Voss has a wide range of habitats, from high barren mountains to rich fertile valleys. The large areas of coniferous forests provide food and shelter for a host of species, while the many wetland areas are regarded as some of the most interesting birding habitats in the county. There is a bird reserve at Lønaøyane with marked paths and a tower hide. Over 155 species have been seen there. Many are common in Scandinavia, but the area has also produced such unexpected species as the great egret, European hobby, and woodlark.

Notable residents
 The Arts 

 Christiane Schreiber (1822-1898) a Norwegian portrait painter
 Knud Bergslien (1827–1908) painter, art teacher and master artist
 Ola Mosafinn (1828–1912) a Norwegian Hardanger fiddle player and composer
 Brynjulf Bergslien (1830–1898) sculptor
 Nils Bergslien (1853–1928) an illustrator, painter and sculptor
 Sjur Helgeland (1858−1924) a Norwegian hardingfele fiddler and composer
 Lars Tvinde (1886–1973) a stage and film actor 
 Lars Fletre (1904–1977) a Norwegian-American designer, sculptor and painter
 Liv Bernhoft Osa (born 1957) a Norwegian actress 
 Olav Dale (1958–2014) a composer, orchestra leader and jazz saxophonist
 Kåre Kolve (born 1964) & Ivar Kolve (born 1967) jazz musicians
 Signe Førre (born 1994) a singer, upright bassist and composer

Athletes

 Jon Istad (1937–2012) a biathlete and sport shooter
 Rune Hauge (born 1954) football agent
 Odd Lirhus (born 1956) 1978 World Cup winner in biathlon
 Gisle Fenne (born 1963) a former World Cup silver medalist in biathlon
 Trond Egil Soltvedt (born 1967) former footballer with 350 caps and 4 for Norway
 Hilde Synnøve Lid (born 1971) a freestyle skier Olympic medallist
 Astrid Lødemel (born 1971) a retired alpine skier, 1992 World Cup silver medalist
 Gro Marit Istad Kristiansen (born 1978) 2005 World champion in biathlon
 Jori Mørkve (born 1980) a Norwegian former biathlete
 Alexander Ødegaard (born 1980) a former footballer, with over 350 caps and 4 for Norway
 Sjur Røthe (born 1988) cross-country skier
 Hilde Fenne (born 1993) a retired biathlete
 Hedda Hosås (born 2001) a rallycross driver

Olympic champions
Voss is a winter sports center and has in recent times been the home of many world-class athletes in several winter sports, most prominently biathlon, but also alpine skiing, nordic skiing and freestyle skiing. In all, athletes from Voss have won 6 gold medals, 5 silver medals and 7 bronze medals at winter Olympic games. Athletes from Voss have been present, representing Norway, at every winter Olympic games except one since 1948 Winter Olympics, the exception being 1972.

 Eirik Kvalfoss, 1984 Winter Olympics (biathlon, sprint)
 Kristen Skjeldal, 1992 Winter Olympics (cross-country skiing, relay)
 Hilde Synnøve Lid, 1994 Winter Olympics bronze medal winner in freestyle
 Jan Einar Thorsen, 1994 Winter Olympics,  bronze medal winner in downhill
 Kari Traa, 2002 Winter Olympics (freestyle skiing, moguls)
 Egil Gjelland, 2002 Winter Olympics (biathlon, relay)
 Lars Bystøl, 2006 Winter Olympics (ski jumping, K90)

Public Servants & TV 

 Jens Gran Gleditsch (1860–1931) theologian and Bishop of Nidaros
 Johannes Lid (1886–1971) a Norwegian botanist
 Lars Leiro (1914–2005) a Norwegian politician, former Transport Minister
 Svein Blindheim (1916–2013) a military officer, known for his resistance work 
 Jon Lilletun (1945-2006) politician, Minister of Education and Research, 1997-2001
 Gunnstein Akselberg (born 1949) linguist and academic
 Ingvild Bryn (born 1961) a journalist and news anchor for NRK
 Arne Hjeltnes (born 1963) a writer and presenter for TV2
 Linda Eide (born 1969) a TV and radio presenter, comedian, actor and chat-show host
 Guri Solberg (born 1976) TV host at TV2

Norwegian-Americans
Like the rest of Western Norway, Voss saw large-scale emigration, particularly to the United States, in the 19th and early 20th centuries.

 Elling Eielsen (1804–1883) the first Lutheran Church leader in the USA
 Iver Lawson (1821–1871) a real estate investor and newspaper publisher
 John Anderson (1836–1910) founder and publisher Skandinaven''
 Eli Pederson (1837–1909) Wisconsin State Assemblyman
 Knute Nelson (1843–1923) US Senator & 12th Governor of Minnesota 1893-1895
 Canute R. Matson (1843–1903) Sheriff of Cook County, Illinois
 Aad J. Vinje (1857–1929) Chief Justice of the Wisconsin Supreme Court
 Thorstein Himle (1857–1925) missionary with the Lutheran Hauge Synod
 Ragnvald Nestos (1877–1942) the 13th Governor of North Dakota 1921–1925.
 Torkild Rieber (1882–1968) chairman of Texaco
 Knute Rockne (1888–1931) American footballer and coach, commemorated by a memorial in Vossevangen
 Lars Fletre (1904–1977) a designer and sculptor

Science
 Aad Knutsson Gjelle (1768–1840), cartographer

References

External links

Municipal fact sheet from Statistics Norway 
Vossestrand 
The Norwegian Birding Route

 
Municipalities of Vestland
1838 establishments in Norway
Petty kingdoms of Norway